Emslandlager ("Emsland camps") were a series of 15 moorland labor, punitive and POWs-camps, active from 1933 to 1945 and located in the districts of Emsland and Bentheim, Lower Saxony, Germany. The central administration was set in Papenburg where now a memorial of these camps, the Dokumentations- und Informationszentrum (DIZ) Emslandlager, is located.

In Emslandlager VII camp, seven Belgian Freemasons and resistance fighters founded Liberté chérie in 1943, one of the very few Masonic lodges established within a Nazi concentration camp.

Börgermoor concentration camp

The first and one of the most important of these camps was the Börgermoor concentration camp, situated near the current municipality of Surwold, in Lower Saxony. In June 1933 the first 1000 German political opponents to be held in protective custody (Schutzhaft) arrived at the site of the camp, which they built from scratch, as well as the Esterwegen concentration camp.
In 1934 the camp became a punitive one, under the supervision of the Reich Ministry of Justice, and criminals, homosexuals and Jehovah's Witnesses arrived in large numbers, until all the political inmates were moved to the Emslandlager Aschendorfermoor camp in 1937. Starting in 1940, the camp housed increasing numbers of German military personnel held in custody for desertion or unauthorized absence from their military unit. By 1942 they accounted for 50% of the prisoners.

The Börgermoor concentration camp was also the birthplace of one of the best known protest songs, the "Peat Bog Soldiers".

After WWII
Emslandlager was also the site of a post World War II British sector displaced person camp near Emsland in Lower Saxony in Germany.

Maczków was the name of the central town of a Polish military enclave in Emsland, Germany, existing from 1945–1947, later renamed back to Haren. Maczków became a totally Polish town with a Polish mayor, a Polish school, a Polish fire brigade and a Polish rectory. The latter registered 289 weddings and 101 funerals. 479 Poles have birth certificates showing Maczków as place of birth. The town was returned to the original inhabitants when the Polish army unit returned to England in June 1947, and the Polish inhabitants of the town were either repatriated to Poland or moved to Great Britain.

See also
 Forced labour under German Nazi rule

References

External links
 
 Official site of the DIZ Emslandlager in Papenburg 
 A Polish enclave in Germany

Displaced persons camps in the aftermath of World War II
Emslandlager